Lieutenant I (formerly Detective III) Julio Sanchez is a fictional character featured in TNT's The Closer and its follow-up series Major Crimes, portrayed by Raymond Cruz. Sanchez was a detective with the Los Angeles Police Department's Major Crimes Division. He is now a lieutenant with Los Angeles Police Department's Criminal Intelligence Division, accepting the promotion in "By Any Means", Part 4"

Personal information
Fluent in both Spanish and English, Julio is an expert on street gangs. He has a quick temper and often yells at suspects in the interrogation room. He also can be crude and chauvinistic, particularly in early seasons. Though constantly flirting with the younger women detectives, Sanchez wears a wedding band. He is very respectful of rank, almost always addressing superiors as "sir" or "ma'am".  He has one brother who is dead, and another in prison after getting involved with gangs. In "Sanctuary City, Part 3," it’s revealed that Sanchez is a third generation American. In "Risk Assessment" of Major Crimes, Julio explains to Rusty Beck that he wanted to become a cop after his cat got murdered and he wanted to catch the killers. Julio tells Rusty he did eventually put the men away for attempted murder and rape and they got life in prison as they were on their third strike and shows great satisfaction at the result.

In The Closer
It seems at first that he is married, but in Brenda and Fritz's wedding video (season 4 episode "Double Blind"), he reveals that he has been a widower for six years.

In season four episode "Sudden Death", Julio's brother Oscar is shot to death by a gang member on the sidewalk near his home because he was believed to be part of a rival gang. Once the case is closed, Julio confesses to Provenza that he had given his brother the hat that the killers mistook for a symbol of a rival gang affiliation which led to Oscar's death, upon which Julio breaks down crying. Later in the season ("Time Bomb"), Julio is shot three times by bullets intended for Provenza. Julio survives, after five surgeries and shoulder reconstruction, and is back on the force via Chief Johnson's recommendation in that season's "Good Faith".

In season six episode "Help Wanted", Julio takes in the son of a serial rapist whose mother is in Mexico temporarily. Ruben is later reunited with his mother Maria Hernandez ("Heart Attack"), and Julio asks to take her to dinner (with Ruben).

As seen in "Repeat Offender", Julio holds the rank of Detective II.

In Major Crimes
Julio Sanchez continues as a main/regular character on Major Crimes.

Having previously been shot in an episode of The Closer (see section above), Sanchez was shot again in "Two Options". His wound is stated to be superficial and he quickly returns to work.

Sanchez is shown to get emotional at times in cases regarding children. In "Flight Risk", Sanchez was completely devastated when two young children were found murdered and was one of the most affected of the squad. When they interrogate the killer, Sanchez attacks him but is in tears as he does so.

In season three's "Personal Day", a young man Julio put in prison for murder in 1997 gets released after seventeen years in prison and insists to Julio he's innocent despite overwhelming evidence and a confession. Julio refuses to believe the man and only reports his claims due to procedure. The man is later murdered and Julio is shocked to learn the man was innocent as he'd claimed, having confessed to murder rather than an armed robbery to protect his best friend. The squad are able to catch the true killer and Julio informs the man's ill grandmother of his innocence. To help make up for his mistake, Julio reopens the investigations into the murders of the man's father and uncle which had been unsolved for over twenty years.

In season three's "Party Foul", a young man the squad suspects of murdering a young man and badly injuring her boyfriend faces off with Sanchez who makes fun of his No Romeo license plate. The young man tells him that what it means is that before meeting Juliet, Romeo was in love with another girl but let go of his love for when he saw Juliet. The young man is no Romeo as he would never do that to the girl he loves. Upon hearing that, Sanchez softens towards the man and twists his wedding ring, showing he feels the same about his deceased wife.

In season three episode "Internal Affairs", Sanchez is ordered to attend anger management classes after beating up his mother's caretaker who had robbed her in order to remain on active duty after his violent tendencies come to light. He was briefly framed for the murder of said caretaker, but was cleared of those charges after which he moved back in with his mother to take care of her himself. However, he brutally beat a serial killer shortly afterwards in "Special Master, Part Two" and is suspended without pay for five months afterwards.

In season four episode "Sorry I Missed You", Sanchez explains the source of his constant anger problems: several years before he was married and his wife had a seizure disorder. She was told it was safe to go off her medications and later she is able to become pregnant.  Five months pregnant with their first child, a baby girl, his wife had a seizure while driving and crashed her car, dying four days later. Sanchez blames the doctors and can't get over his anger at the unfairness of it all—though since his return from his suspension he seems to have his anger in better check. In "Hindsight, Part 4", Julio visits Maria's doctor to learn why he took Maria off of her seizure medicine. To Julio's shock, he learns the doctor didn't take her off of her medicine, Maria took herself off of it. The doctor had advised against Maria doing so and even had her sign a form he shows Julio that proves his story. Julio is left upset by the news and the fact that Maria had lied to him about it.

In seasons four to six of Major Crimes, Julio begins to get back into dating without much luck. In the five-part "Hindsight" arc at the end of season four, Julio develops a relationship with Detective Stephanie Dunn who, like him, suffered the loss of a loved one unexpectedly, in her case, her husband. The two go on a date and Julio is implied to spend the night with her. Unfortunately, Stephanie herself proves to be the killer of all of the victims, including her husband, putting an end to the relationship. Later, in early season five, Julio attempts what appears to be a blind date but is stood up. Instead, Julio becomes the last person to see an undercover officer alive before his murder. In season 6's four-part "Conspiracy Theory", Julio is revealed to have had some sort of intimate relationship with Las Vegas Metro Police Detective Linda Chavez, one that he appears to not be enthusiastic about continuing. Despite this, Julio calls Linda for help with finding a possible rape victim, resulting in Linda attempting to call Julio and talking dirty but getting Assistant Chief Mason instead due to a mix-up. Linda promises that Julio will owe her a dinner for her help and he responds with some enthusiasm to the idea.

In season five, Julio begins applying to be a foster parent after seeing the effects of the system in "Present Tense". In "Cashed Out", Rusty's former social worker Cynthia does a surprise home study on Julio and investigates his actions in solving a brutal murder that ended with Julio risking his life to successfully talk a dangerous suspect down rather than shooting him or resorting to other forms of violence as Julio would in the past. Julio spends a week under review as a result on possibly getting the Medal of Valor for how he handled the situation while the rest of the squad are shown to have various responses to Julio's risky actions. Julio assures Cynthia of his putting that same dedication into raising a child if he's allowed to foster while Rusty adds his own support to Julio from his own perspective of knowing Julio when he first came off the streets and into foster care. In "By Any Means, Part 1," Julio is seen with the Medal of Valor upon his uniform, confirming that he did in fact receive it.

In "Family Law", Julio is approved to be a foster parent and takes emergency placement of an eight-year-old boy named Mark Jarvis who is racist with an attitude problem. At the end of the episode, it is discovered that Mark's mother has been murdered and he has nowhere to go. Julio continues to foster Mark through the investigation into his mother's murder and the investigation into the Zyklon Brotherhood. Julio and Mark develop a father/son relationship that ends when DCFS finds Mark's grandparents and are forced to remove him from Julio's custody, leading to an emotional goodbye between the two. Following this, Julio is shown to keep a picture of Mark on his desk until Mark returns to his life after his grandfather's stroke. After the stroke, Mark's grandmother chooses to transfer permanent legal guardianship of Mark to Julio, making Mark Julio's legal ward.

In "Sanctuary City, Part 1", it is revealed that Julio's mother has died and he is now on bereavement leave. As a result, Sharon has Buzz Watson, now a Reserve Detective, fill in for Julio in the field and interrogation. Julio eventually returns in "Sanctuary City, Part 3", five days early to help solve the case of the St. Joseph's Three.

Between Season 7 of The Closer and Season 6 of Major Crimes, Julio was promoted to the rank of Detective III (as seen in "By Any Means, Part 1").

In "By Any Means, Part 3," Julio mentions that he is seeking a new home closer to Mark's school and discusses with Assistant Chief Mason an offer that he hasn't decided on yet. Tao later reveals to Provenza that working homicides is hard on Julio as a single father. As a result, Mason has offered Julio a promotion to lieutenant and a transfer to the Criminal Intelligence Division where he will have a less dangerous and demanding job. Julio is still trying to decide whether or not he will take the new job.

In "By Any Means, Part 4," following the death of Phillip Stroh, Julio accepts the promotion to lieutenant and leaves the Major Crimes Division to join the Criminal Intelligence Division. At his promotion ceremony, Julio makes a speech thanking his friends for what his time with them has given him and stating how hard his decision was. Before leaving with Mark, Julio privately tells Rusty to continue his sessions with Doctor Joe as Rusty will need them, appearing to know that Rusty killed Stroh instead of Provenza as Provenza claimed

Awards and decorations
The following are the medals and service awards fictionally worn by Detective Sanchez.

Fictional Los Angeles Police Department detectives
The Closer characters